The 2003 season of the Toppserien, the highest women's football (soccer) league in Norway, began on 16 April 2003 and ended on 2 November 2003.

18 games were played with 3 points given for wins and 1 for draws. Number nine and ten were relegated, while the two top teams from the First Division were promoted.

Trondheims-Ørn won the league.

League table

Top goalscorers
 15 goals:
  Bente Musland, Arna-Bjørnar
  Marianne Pettersen, Asker
  Solveig Gulbrandsen, Kolbotn
 12 goals:
  Tonje Hansen, Kolbotn
  Ingunn Sørum, Liungen
 11 goals:
  Elene Moseby, Team Strømmen
  Heidi Pedersen, Trondheims-Ørn
 9 goals:
  Ingrid Camilla Fosse Sæthre, Arna-Bjørnar
  Kjersti Thun, Asker
  Christine Bøe Jensen, Kolbotn
 8 goals:
  Veronica Stefanussen, Fløya
  Lene Espedal, Klepp
  Brit Sandaune, Trondheims-Ørn

Promotion and relegation
 Liungen and Larvik were relegated to the First Division
 Sandviken and Medkila were promoted from the First Division.

References
League table
Fixtures
Goalscorers

Toppserien seasons
Top level Norwegian women's football league seasons
1
Nor
Nor